Stevensons Island (Te Peka Karara) is a small  island in the Stevensons Arm section of Lake Wānaka, New Zealand.
There are two small islets close to the south end of the island.

Buff weka were introduced to Stevensons Island in 2002 from the Chatham Islands.
In 2009 they were removed due to a rabbit outbreak that attracted predators which killed four birds. They were then reintroduced in 2013.

See also

 Desert island
 List of islands

References

Uninhabited islands of New Zealand
Islands of Otago
Lake islands of New Zealand